Dascylium or Daskylion  or Daskyleion (Δασκυλεῖον) was a town in ancient Caria, mentioned by Stephanus of Byzantium. It was located near the frontiers of Ephesus.

Its site is unlocated.

References

Populated places in ancient Caria
Former populated places in Turkey
Locations in Greek mythology